The Consorzio Interuniversitario Lombardo per l'Elaborazione Automatica (CILEA) was a consortium of universities in Italy. Founded in 1974, it operated from headquarters in Milan. In July 2013 CILEA merged into the CINECA academic consortium.

History
The consortium aimed to promote the applications of computer science to meet the needs of research and, secondly, university teaching. Over time the consortium diversified its activities and developed services related to electronic publishing, digital libraries, high-performance computing, software development, and technical support. It also increased its staff, and expanded its target audience to include both Lombardy and the rest of Italy.

In 1998 the consortium launched the CILEA Digital Library (CDL), which participated in several related groups: Osservatorio italiano sulla cooperazione per le risorse informative elettroniche (INFER), International Coalition of Library Consortia (ICOLC), and Southern European Libraries Link (SELL). The library also collaborated with Italian consortia Coordinamento Interuniversitario Basi dati & Editoria in Rete (CIBER) and Cooperazione Interuniversitaria Periodici Elettronici (CIPE).

See also
 List of universities in Italy

References

This article incorporates information from the Italian Wikipedia.

Further reading
  1984-2012

External links
 Former official site: 
  (runs on Open Journal Systems software)

Universities in Italy
College and university associations and consortia in Europe
Educational organisations based in Italy
1974 establishments in Italy
2013 disestablishments in Italy
Organizations established in 1974
Science and technology in Italy
Supercomputer sites
Organizations disestablished in 2013